Henry Arnold Waxman (born September 12, 1939) is an American politician who served as a U.S. representative from California from 1975 to 2015. He is a member of the Democratic Party.

His district included much of the western part of the city of Los Angeles, as well as West Hollywood, Santa Monica, and Beverly Hills, and was numbered the 24th district from 1975 to 1993, the 29th district from 1993 to 2003, and the 30th district from 2003 to 2013, changing because of redistricting after the 1990, 2000, and 2010 censuses. He now serves as chairman at Waxman Strategies, a D. C.-based communications and lobbying firm, working on health care, environmental, energy, technology, financial services, labor, and telecommunications issues. In addition, he serves as a Regent Lecturer for University of California, Los Angeles, and as an advisor and lecturer at the Johns Hopkins Bloomberg School of Public Health.

Waxman was considered to be one of the most influential liberal members of Congress, and was instrumental in passing laws including the Infant Formula Act of 1980, the Orphan Drug Act of 1983, the Drug Price Competition and Patent Term Restoration Act of 1984, the Clean Air Act of 1990, the Ryan White CARE Act of 1990, the Food Quality Protection Act of 1996, the State Children's Health Insurance Program of 1997, the Postal Accountability and Enhancement Act of 2006, the Family Smoking Prevention and Tobacco Control Act of 2009, and the Patient Protection and Affordable Care Act of 2010. He served as Chairman of the House Committee on Oversight and Government Reform from 2007 to 2009, Chairman of the House Committee on Energy and Commerce from 2009 to 2011, and was the ranking member of the Energy and Commerce Committee from 2011 until 2015. On January 30, 2014, Waxman announced he would not seek re-election to a 21st term in 2014. State senator Ted Lieu defeated district attorney Elan Carr and author Marianne Williamson in the mid-term election on November 4, 2014, and succeeded Waxman on January 3, 2015.

Early life, education, and early career
Waxman was born to a Jewish household in Los Angeles, California, the son of Esther (née Silverman) and Ralph Louis Waxman. His father was born in Montreal, Canada; his mother was from Pennsylvania. All of his grandparents were Jewish immigrants from Russia. He attended college at UCLA, earning a bachelor's degree in political science in 1961 and a J.D. degree from UCLA School of Law in 1964. After graduating, he worked as a lawyer. He was elected to the California State Assembly in 1968, and served three terms. Along with U.S. Representative Howard Berman, Waxman co-founded the Los Angeles County Young Democrats.

U.S. House of Representatives

Elections
In 1974, Democratic U.S. Representative Chet Holifield retired after 16 terms in Congress. Waxman gave up his state assembly seat to run for the district, which had been re-numbered from the 19th to the 24th in a mid-decade redistricting. Waxman won the Democratic nomination for the district, and easily won the general election, as this was tantamount to election in this heavily Democratic district. He was re-elected 17 times, with no substantive opposition. He faced no major-party opposition in 1986, and was completely unopposed in 2008. His district changed numbers four times in his tenure — from the 24th (1975–1993) to the 29th (1993–2003) to the 30th (2003–2013) to the 33rd (2013-2015). At the time of his retirement, he was one of the last two members, along with George Miller of California, of the large Democratic freshman class of 1975.

From 2003 to 2013, Waxman's district included Santa Monica, Beverly Hills, Agoura Hills, Calabasas, Hidden Hills, Malibu, West Hollywood, and Westlake Village, as well as such areas of western Los Angeles as West Los Angeles, Fairfax, Pacific Palisades, Brentwood, Beverlywood, Topanga, Chatsworth, Palms, Westwood, West Hills, Westside Village, Woodland Hills, but through the creation of a new 33rd Congressional District by the California Citizens Redistricting Commission, in the November 2012 general election, Waxman won re-election in an area including his home community of Beverly Hills and stretching to Malibu and Pacific-coastal communities heading south, including Santa Monica, Manhattan Beach, Redondo Beach, Hermosa Beach, the Palos Verdes Peninsula, and Northwest San Pedro.

Tenure
Before the Democrats lost control of the House of Representatives in 1995, Waxman was a powerful figure in the House as chair of the Energy and Commerce Subcommittee on Health and the Environment from 1979. In this role, he conducted investigations into a range of health and environmental issues, including universal health insurance, Medicare and Medicaid coverage, AIDS, and air and water pollution. In 1994, Waxman forced the chief executives of the seven major tobacco companies to swear under oath that nicotine was not addictive.

Waxman's stated legislative priorities are health and environmental issues. These include universal health insurance, Medicare and Medicaid coverage, tobacco, AIDS, air and water quality standards, pesticides, nursing home quality standards, women's health research and reproductive rights, the availability and cost of prescription drugs, and the right of communities to know about pollution levels. As an example of Waxman's thoughts regarding tobacco, on April 13, 2010, he requested that Major League Baseball ban smokeless tobacco in all its various forms - snuff, dipping tobacco, chewing tobacco, snus, etc.

With the Democrats' victory in the 2006 midterm elections, Waxman became chairman of the House Oversight and Government Reform Committee, the principal investigative committee of the House. He was the committee's ranking Democrat from 1997 to 2007. In 1998, while he was still ranking member, he created a "Special Investigations Division" to investigate matters that he felt the full committee had neglected. This was possible because the committee has broad powers to investigate any matter with federal policy implications, even if another committee has jurisdiction over it. He has also harshly criticized the Republicans for ignoring their "constitutional responsibility" to conduct oversight over the government.

On March 16, 2004, at Waxman's request, the Committee on Government Reform Minority Office published "Iraq on the Record, the Bush Administration's Public Statements on Iraq", a detailed and searchable collection of 237 specific misleading statements made by Bush Administration officials about the threat posed by Iraq. It contains statements that were misleading based on what was known to the Administration at the time the statements were made. It does not include statements that appear mistaken only in hindsight. If a statement was an accurate reflection of U.S. intelligence at the time it was made, it was excluded even if it now appears erroneous.

In 2006, Project On Government Oversight, a government watchdog group, presented Waxman with its Good Government Award for his various contributions to government transparency and oversight.

On the day after the 2006 elections, Waxman directed his aides to draw up an "oversight plan" for the panel. He had already let it be known that he wanted to investigate Halliburton, as well as its alleged malfeasance related to government contracts in Iraq. It is very likely that he could also investigate the numerous scandals surrounding Jack Abramoff. This led to concerns among Democratic aides that the Government Reform Committee under Waxman would stage a repeat of the committee's performance under the Clinton administration, when it issued over 1,000 subpoenas. However, Waxman told Newsweek that he is interested in accountability and not retaliation.

In 2009, he began serving as the Chairman of the House Energy and Commerce Committee, after defeating Chairman John Dingell in a 137–122 secret vote of House Democrats on November 20, 2008.

Senator Alan Simpson of Wyoming once described Waxman as being 'tougher than a boiled owl.'

Waxman is proud of his "strong Jewish identity" and has drawn political conclusions from his exploration of the religion. "Judaism is about acting and doing the right thing, not simply believing in it or mindlessly following ritual," he said in a speech presented by the University of Southern California's Casden Institute for the Study of the Jewish Role in American Life. Waxman said he applies Jewish ethical values to his congressional service. He further said that the "Jewish values" of "human rights, social justice, and equal opportunities ... are synonymous with American values," and that such values "are in my opinion closer to a Democratic position." Waxman supported fellow representative Jane Harman during her primary challenge from Marcy Winograd when Winograd said she would support a one-state solution to the Israeli-Palestinian conflict, instead of the two-state resolution endorsed by Waxman and Harman. Saying it suffers from "a culture of corruption" and "has become obsessed with secrecy," he accused the American government of having abandoned these values. "(The) Republican leadership ignores presidential rules and norms and has no consideration for custom," he said.

Abortion
Waxman was strongly critical of the Stupak-Pitts Amendment, which places limits on taxpayer-funded abortions in the context of the November 2009 Affordable Health Care for America Act. Instead of this version, it was reported that many Democrats supported a version that would find "common ground."

1985 subway opposition
In 1985, Waxman sponsored a bill supported by affluent homeowners groups in his district to ban federal funding for the Red Line subway after a methane gas explosion in the Fairfax District. In 2005, a robust real estate market, multi-dwelling construction boom, and lack of public mass transit planning on the westside caused by Waxman's bill resulted in gridlock throughout Waxman's district. At the request of Los Angeles Mayor and LACMTA Board President Antonio Villaraigosa, Waxman agreed to lift the ban if a panel of five engineers found tunneling under the Miracle Mile stretch of Wilshire Boulevard to be safe. In October 2005, the panel decided that tunneling was possible, and on December 16, Waxman responded by announcing he would introduce a bill to the U.S. House that would lift the ban on federal money for subway tunneling in the district. This bill passed the House via unanimous vote on September 20, 2006.

Waxman maintains that the 1985 bill was sponsored in the interest of public safety and not, as some allege, to hinder access of the working classes in South and East Los Angeles to his affluent district. In a letter to the Los Angeles Times, Waxman cites the 2005 study: "The panel concurred as well that in 1985, the decision to hold further tunneling in abeyance was prudent, given the circumstances and extent of information and technology at that time. Much has changed since then to significantly improve tunneling and operation safety."

Solyndra
Waxman, as the ranking member of the House Energy and Commerce Committee, oversaw the case of Solyndra, a solar company that filed for bankruptcy after receiving a $535 million loan guarantee from the DOE. Waxman recounted meeting with Solyndra's CEO two months before they filed for bankruptcy, who assured him that "Solyndra’s future was bright with sales and production booming." Waxman was accused of being involved with the Solyndra loan by Darrell Issa. Waxman responded, saying he had no involvement in the selection of the loan.

Committee assignments
 Committee on Energy and Commerce (Ranking Member)
 As ranking member of the full committee, Rep. Waxman may serve as an ex officio member of all subcommittees.

Caucus memberships
 Congressional Progressive Caucus
 Congressional Space Caucus
 Congressional Travel & Tourism Caucus
 International Conservation Caucus

Electoral history

Post-congressional career
Once hailed in the media as a "lobbyist's worst nightmare," Waxman himself became a successful and influential lobbyist when he opened his own firm after retiring from Congress.

In popular culture 
In 2021, Waxman was praised by television host Bill Maher on his HBO Talk Show Series Real Time With Bill Maher. In discussing the concept of political "show horses", as compared to "work horses", Maher described Waxman's legislative achievements and emphasized that Waxman's tenacity and low public profile as a "work horse" allowed him to effect substantial change in the United States, specifically through updates to programs and policies including food safety, clean air, HIV research, and the social safety net. In Waxman's honor, Maher introduced a segment titled "The Baldy Awards", to recognize the achievements of Waxman and other "work horse" politicians.

See also
 Hatch-Waxman Act
 Politicization of science for a brief discussion of Waxman's work on the subject
 Deficit Reduction Act of 2005 for Waxman's take on whether that bill became law or not
 American Clean Energy and Security Act, also known as the Waxman-Markey bill, legislation for the introduction of emissions trading into the United States.
 List of Jewish members of the United States Congress

References

External links

 Waxman Strategies

 

 Profile at the Jewish Virtual Library
 Profile at SourceWatch
 Henry Waxman Papers collected by UCLA Library via Archive-IT. Archived since October, 2014
 Join California Henry A. Waxman
Articles
 Los Angeles Times Interview: Henry Waxman Robert Scheer. LA Times, October 10, 1993
 BuzzFlash Interviews Congressman Henry Waxman  December 24, 2001
 BuzzFlash Interviews Congressman Henry Waxman  January 31, 2002
 Waxman: Democrats' Eliot Ness David Corn, The Nation, January 27, 2005
 Red Line to Somewhere  Christine Pelisek, LA Weekly, Thursday, March 3, 2005, interview on subway proposal
 Rep. Henry Waxman on Karl Rove: "The President Said He Would Fire Anybody He Found Responsible", Democracy Now, July 12, 2005
 On Chalabi, Congress, and Getting Back to Work Rep. Henry Waxman, Huffington Post, November 12, 2005
 Congressman writes White House: Did President knowingly sign law that didn't pass? , The Raw Story, March 15, 2006
 The Scariest Guy in Washington Karen Tumulty, Time, November 27, 2006

|-

|-

|-

|-

|-

|-

1939 births
Living people
American people of Moldovan-Jewish descent
American people of Russian-Jewish descent
Democratic Party members of the California State Assembly
Democratic Party members of the United States House of Representatives from California
Jewish American state legislators in California
Jewish members of the United States House of Representatives
UCLA School of Law alumni
21st-century American politicians
John C. Fremont High School alumni
21st-century American Jews
Members of Congress who became lobbyists